Myint Aung was the Burmese Minister of Mines from 2012 to 2016. He was appointed in September 2012 by President Thein Sein, replacing Thein Htaik, who became the Union Auditor General. He is a former Civil Service Board member.

References

Government ministers of Myanmar
Living people
Year of birth missing (living people)